Food Safety News (FSN) is an online news publication focusing on food safety. It was founded in 2009 by Bill Marler, a lawyer and food safety advocate. Marler is the Managing Partner of Marler Clark, a Seattle, Washington, law firm that specializes in foodborne illness cases. He said that Food Safety News was created to "fill a void" left by print and broadcast media as budgetary constraints led to "dedicated reporters on the food, health and safety beats... being reassigned or seeing their positions disappear altogether." The site provides daily news coverage of foodborne illness outbreaks and investigations, food recalls, food technology innovations, and victim profiles.

News staff
FSN's Editor in Chief is Dan Flynn The Managing Editor is Coral Beach.

References

American journalism organizations
Internet properties established in 2009
American news websites
Food safety organizations
Food safety in the United States
Food recalls
Foodborne illnesses
Food safety scandals